The 2017 BNP Paribas Open (also known as the 2017 Indian Wells Masters) was a professional tennis tournament played at Indian Wells, California in March 2017. It was the 44th edition of the men's event and 29th of the women's event, and was classified as an ATP World Tour Masters 1000 event on the 2017 ATP World Tour and a Premier Mandatory event on the 2017 WTA Tour. Both the men's and the women's events took place at the Indian Wells Tennis Garden in Indian Wells, California, from March 6 through March 19, 2017, on outdoor hard courts.

Points and prize money

Point distribution

 Players with byes receive first-round points.

Prize money

ATP singles main-draw entrants

Seeds

The following are the seeded players. Rankings and seedings are based on ATP rankings as of March 6, 2017.

Other entrants
The following players received wildcards into the singles main draw:
  Bjorn Fratangelo
  Taylor Fritz
  Stefan Kozlov
  Reilly Opelka
  Frances Tiafoe

The following players received entry using a protected ranking:
  Tommy Robredo
  Dmitry Tursunov

The following players received entry from the qualifying draw:
  Radu Albot
  Nikoloz Basilashvili
  Julien Benneteau
  Marius Copil
  Federico Gaio
  Santiago Giraldo
  Peter Gojowczyk
  Darian King
  Henri Laaksonen
  Dušan Lajović
  Vasek Pospisil
  Elias Ymer

The following players received entry as lucky losers:
  Mikhail Kukushkin
  Yoshihito Nishioka

Withdrawals
Before the tournament
  Nicolás Almagro → replaced by  Kevin Anderson
  Marcos Baghdatis → replaced by  Konstantin Kravchuk
  Steve Darcis → replaced by  Renzo Olivo
  David Ferrer (Achilles tendon injury) → replaced by  Donald Young
  Richard Gasquet (appendicitis) → replaced by  Yoshihito Nishioka
  Paul-Henri Mathieu (birth of child) → replaced by  Thiago Monteiro
  Florian Mayer → replaced by  Guido Pella
  Milos Raonic (hamstring injury) → replaced by  Mikhail Kukushkin
  Gilles Simon → replaced by  Ryan Harrison

During the tournament
  Roberto Bautista Agut
  Nick Kyrgios

Retirements
  Alexandr Dolgopolov
  Jordan Thompson

ATP doubles main-draw entrants

Seeds

1 Rankings as of March 6, 2017.

Other entrants
The following pairs received wildcards into the doubles main draw:
  Juan Martín del Potro /  Leander Paes
  Nick Kyrgios /  Nenad Zimonjić
The following pair received entry as alternates:
  Benoît Paire /  Michael Venus

Withdrawals
Before the tournament
  Jo-Wilfried Tsonga (foot injury)

During the tournament
  Roberto Bautista Agut

WTA singles main-draw entrants

Seeds
The following are the seeded players. Seedings are based on WTA rankings as of February 27, 2017. Rankings and points before are as of March 6, 2017.

Other entrants
The following players received wildcards into the singles main draw:
  Jennifer Brady
  Danielle Collins
  Irina Falconi
  Kayla Day
  Nicole Gibbs
  Bethanie Mattek-Sands
  Taylor Townsend
  Donna Vekić

The following player received entry using a protected ranking:
  Ajla Tomljanović

The following players received entry from the qualifying draw:
  Mona Barthel
  Mariana Duque Mariño
  Anett Kontaveit
  Varvara Lepchenko
  Magda Linette
  Tatjana Maria
  Mandy Minella
  Risa Ozaki
  Peng Shuai
  Francesca Schiavone
  Sara Sorribes Tormo
  Patricia Maria Țig

The following player received entry as a lucky loser:
  Evgeniya Rodina

Withdrawals
Before the tournament
 Victoria Azarenka (maternity) → replaced by  Vania King
 Alizé Cornet (torn pectoral) → replaced by  Heather Watson
 Anna-Lena Friedsam → replaced by  Sorana Cîrstea
 Karin Knapp → replaced by  Mirjana Lučić-Baroni
 Petra Kvitová (knife attack injury) → replaced by  Ajla Tomljanović
 Sloane Stephens (foot surgery) → replaced by  Kurumi Nara
 Serena Williams (knee injury) → replaced by  Evgeniya Rodina

Retirements
 Timea Bacsinszky
 Vania King

WTA doubles main-draw entrants

Seeds

1 Rankings as of February 27, 2017.

Other entrants
The following pairs received wildcards into the doubles main draw:
  Ashleigh Barty /  Casey Dellacqua
  Caroline Garcia /  Karolína Plíšková
  Shelby Rogers /  CoCo Vandeweghe

Champions

Men's singles

  Roger Federer def.  Stan Wawrinka, 6–4, 7–5

Women's singles

  Elena Vesnina def.  Svetlana Kuznetsova, 6−7(6−8), 7−5, 6−4

Men's doubles

  Raven Klaasen /  Rajeev Ram def.  Łukasz Kubot /  Marcelo Melo, 6–7(1–7), 6–4, [10–8]

Women's doubles

  Chan Yung-jan /  Martina Hingis def.  Lucie Hradecká /  Kateřina Siniaková, 7–6(7–4), 6–2

References

External links

Association of Tennis Professionals (ATP) tournament profile

 
2017 BNP Paribas Open
2017 ATP World Tour
2017 WTA Tour
2017 in American tennis
March 2017 sports events in the United States
2017 in sports in California